An election to the Llandeilo Rural District Council was held in April 1910. It was preceded by the 1907 election and followed by the 1913 election. Around half the members were elected unopposed. The successful candidates were also elected to the Llandeilo Board of Guardians.

Ward Results

Bettws (three seats)

Brechfa (one seat)

Glynamman (one seat)

Llandebie (two seats)

Blaenau (Llandebie) (two seats)

Llandeilo Fawr North Ward (three seats)

Llandeilo Fawr South Ward (two seats)

Llandyfeisant (one seat)

Llanegwad (three seats)

Llanfihangel Aberbythych (two seats)

Llanfihangel Cilfragen (one seat)

Llanfynydd (two seats)
David Thomas was re-elected on the returning officer's casting vote.

Llangathen (two seats)

Llansawel (two seats)

Quarter Bach No.1 (one seat)

Quarter Bach No.2 (one seat)

Talley (two seats)

Llandeilo Board of Guardians

All members of the District Council also served as members of Llandeilo Board of Guardians. A further three Guardians were elected to represent the Llandeilo Urban District.

In addition, three Guardians were elected to represent the Ammanford Urban District which also lay within the remit of the Llandeilo Guardians. All three sitting members were returned although Henry Herbert, a member of the Guardians for 25 years, only secured a narrow majority over a Labour candidate.

Ammanford (three seats)

Llandeilo (three seats)

References

1910 Welsh local elections
Elections in Carmarthenshire